Věra Štruncová (born 1 March 1946) is a Czech volleyball player. She competed in the women's tournament at the 1968 Summer Olympics.

References

1946 births
Living people
Czech women's volleyball players
Olympic volleyball players of Czechoslovakia
Volleyball players at the 1968 Summer Olympics
Sportspeople from Plzeň